In the terminology of professional sports in North America, teams are often said to be based not in a city but in a media market.  The size of the media market is usually a good indication of the potential viability of a major league team.  A small market team is likely to struggle to compete financially against teams from larger markets and may therefore also be outbid in the competition for top talent.  This has led to calls for revenue sharing, luxury taxes, and / or salary caps in most North American sports leagues in order to ensure competitive balance or parity.

See also
List of North American media markets

External links
 Column: "Small Market Mania" by Jonathan Phillips, Sports Illustrated
 Handbook on the Economics of Sport by Wladimir Andreff and Stefan Szymanski

Terminology used in multiple sports